The Garland Encyclopedia of World Music is an academic reference work. It was initiated by editors at Garland Publishing in 1988 as a 10-volume series of encyclopedias of world music. The final volumes appeared in 2001, but editions have since been updated. It is widely regarded as an authoritative academic source for ethnomusicology. It is published by Routledge, which, like Garland Science, is now part of Taylor & Francis Group. 

 Volume 1: Africa - ed. Ruth M. Stone (Professor of Folklore and Ethnomusicology, Indiana), 1997
 Volume 2: South America, Mexico, Central America, and the Caribbean - ed. Daniel E. Sheehy and Dale A. Olsen, 1998
 Volume 3: The United States and Canada - ed. Ellen Koskoff (Professor of Ethnomusicology. Eastman School of Music), 2000
 Volume 4: Southeast Asia - ed. Terry E. Miller (Professor Emeritus of Ethnomusicology, Kent State University) and Sean Williams (Evergreen State College), 1998
 Volume 5: South Asia: The Indian Subcontinent - ed. Alison Arnold (North Carolina State University), 1999
 Volume 6: The Middle East - ed. Virginia Danielson (Loeb Music Library, Harvard) and Dwight Reynolds, 2001
 Volume 7: East Asia: China, Japan, and Korea - ed. Robert C. Provine (Professor of Ethnomusicology, University of Maryland) and J. Lawrence Witzleben, 2001
 Volume 8: Europe - ed. Timothy Rice (Professor of Ethnomusicology, UCLA Herb Alpert School of Music) and James Porter, 2000
 Volume 9: Australia and the Pacific Islands - ed. Adrienne L. Kaeppler (curator of Oceanic Ethnology at the Smithsonian) and J. W. Love, 1998
 Volume 10: The World's Music: General Perspectives and Reference Tools - ed. Ruth M. Stone

References

Encyclopedias of music
Music literature
20th-century encyclopedias
21st-century encyclopedias